Sanwar Daiya was a well-known Modern Rajasthani writer and translator in Rajasthani and Hindi. He received Sahitya Akademi Award 1985 on "Ek Duniya Mahari"(Collection of Rajasthani short-story). He served for many literary institutes of national.

Works
He wrote Man-gat, kal ar aaj re bichchai, Huve Rang Hajar, Akhar Ri Aankh Soon and short stories collections including Ek Duniya Mahari, Asawade Paswade, Ek Hi Jilad me, Dharti Kad Tani Dhumeli. His collection of Rajasthani short-story, Ek Duniya Mahari received the  Sahitya Akademi Award 1985.

He translated Anil Joshi’ Stechyoo in Rajasthani.

Awards
He was awarded by Sahitya Akademi, Delhi for his "Ek Duniya mahri" in 1985. He was awarded with Ganeshilal Vyas ‘Ustad’ Padhya Puraskar and Dr. L P Tessitory Gadhya Puruskar.

References

Writers from Rajasthan
Rajasthani-language writers
Recipients of the Sahitya Akademi Award in Rajasthani
1948 births
1992 deaths